Marlo Perry (born August 25, 1972 in Forest, Mississippi)  is a former linebacker in the NFL. He played his entire six-year career from 1994-1999 for the Buffalo Bills. He played High School football at Scott Central High School in Forest, Mississippi under Head Coach Bill Scott. He was named SWAC freshman of the year while playing college ball at Jackson State University.

References 

1972 births
Living people
American football linebackers
Buffalo Bills players
Jackson State Tigers football players
People from Forest, Mississippi
Players of American football from Mississippi